Pacific Triangle may refer to:
 Devil's Sea, also known as the Pacific Bermuda Triangle
 Polynesian Triangle
 Red Triangle (Pacific Ocean)